Nandeeswarudu is a 2012 Indian Telugu-language action film produced by Kota Gangadhar Reddy & Segu Ramesh Babu on KFC & SRB Art Productions banner and directed by Sreeenu Yarajala. The film stars Nandamuri Taraka Ratna, Jagapathi Babu, Sheena Shahabadi, and music composed by Parthasarathy. It is a remake of the 2005 Kannada film Deadly Soma. The film recorded as a flop at box-office.

Plot
The film begins with Nandeswara / Nandu a crime lord whose existence gets hard to defile the government. So, the Home Minister sets a target of wiping out him through a sheer cop Commissioner Eeswar Prasad. Eeswar Prasad is a sincere & daredevil as well as a jokester. At present, he pays attention to Nandu's past. Nandu is a resident of an adjacent village, his father Ananda Bhupati is an arbiter and the forefront of that territory. He leads a delightful life with a conscientious joint family and his mother Lakshmi aspires him to see as IPS officer. To achieve it, Nandu lands in the city where he crushes Pragati. Meanwhile, Ranga Rao father-in-law of Nandu's sibling Sivaji humiliates and boots Ananda Bhupati. Being aware of it, Nandu breaks his leg, and is sentenced.

Soon after the release, Nandu knocks back to reach home as he cannot step into the premises as a criminal. Plus, the oath given to his mother obstructs him. Currently, gets back to the city and stays along with his friends. After which, he spots the malevolent forces prevail around under the charge of diabolic goon Babanna and his acolytes Vasanth & Naganna. Once, Vasanth mortifies his friend Seenu's mother Yashoda and chops the hand of boy Chinna that shares a close intimacy with Nandu. At that point, enraged Nandu decapitates him, and following, slaughters Naganna too. Therefrom, the public started adoring him and he seeks justice for the needy affected due to the failure of the law and order system.

Now, Eeswar Prasad gives an ultimatum to Nandu and warns his family. Like a shot, they retort and feel proud of their son's eminence. Here, Eeswar Prasad with the aid of the Chief Minister seeks approval to eliminate the ruffians in the city and also dethrone the Home Minister. Accordingly, Home Minister mingles with Babannaa and ploys to slay Nandu when his friend Saleem dies. Hence, Nandu onslaughts, and ceases them. Later, Eeswar Prasad arrives and encounters Nandu. Next, Eeswara Prasad is assigned a new mission to attain it he solicits the support of a dynamic officer therein Nandu enters as a cop. Indeed, Eeswar Prasad has made a fake encounter, removed the charges on Nandu, and molded him into a Police. At last, Nandu and his family give their gratitude to Eeswar Prasad. The movie ends on a happy note with the marriage of Nandu and Pragati.

Cast

 Nandamuri Taraka Ratna as Nandeeswarudu / Nandu
 Jagapathi Babu as Commissioner Eeswar Prasad
 Sheena Shahabadi
 Suman as Ananda Bhupathi
 M. Balayah as Satya Murthy  
 Chalapathi Rao as DGP
 Ajay as Babanna
 Nagineedu as Home Minister
 Rajiv Kanakala as Saleem
 Banerjee as Banerjee
 G. V. Sudhakar Naidu as Vasanth
 Mukthar Khan as Naganna 
 Vijayachander as CM
 Prabhas Sreenu as Seenu
 Sivaji Raja as Sivaji
 Director Sarath as Sarath
 Kota Shankar Rao as Ranga Rao
 Seeta as Lakshmi 
 Delhi Rajeswari as Yashoda
 Lahari as Lahari
 Jayavani as Bangaram 
 Rachana Maurya as an item number
 Master Athulith as Young Nadeswarudu

Soundtrack

Music composed by Parthasaradhi. Lyrics are written by Ram Paidesetti. The music released on ADITYA Music Company.

References

External links

2012 films
2010s Telugu-language films
Telugu remakes of Kannada films
Indian crime action films
2012 crime action films
Biographical action films
Indian films based on actual events